The Howrah - SMVT Bengaluru Superfast Express is a Superfast train belonging to South Eastern Railway zone that runs between Howrah Junction and Sir M. Visvesvaraya Terminal, Bengaluru in India. It is currently being operated with 12863/12864 train numbers on a daily basis.

Service

The 12863/Howrah - Yesvantpur SF Express has an average speed of 57 km/hr and covers 1960 km in 34h 40m. The 12864/Yesvantpur - Howrah SF Express has an average speed of 57 km/hr and covers 1960 km in 34h 40m. Firstly it cuts from Katpadi Jn. and directly Connects to Renigunta Jn. without touching Tirupati later from the year 2005 the train goes through Tirupati after cancellation of Tirupati Howrah Express. From 04.06.2019 the train is LHBfied from Howrah Jn. & from 06.06.2019 Yesvantpur. From 13.06.2019 the train is LHBfied from Howrah Jn. & from 15.06.2019 Yesvantpur 2nd rake. The train will fully LHBfied after getting the other two dedicated rakes for the route but now it has got only two rake as on 13.06.19. 3rd rake of this train will be LHBfied wef 24.07.2019 from Howrah Jn. and wef 26.07.2019 from Yesvantpur. At last the last and the 4th rake wef 29.07.2019 from Howrah Jn. and wef 31.07.2019 from Yeswantpur. Then from August 2019 the train will finally run with fully LHBfied coaches on the tracks.

In this E-Catering facility is also available at the following stations HOWRAH, KHARAGPUR, VISHAKAPATANAM, SAMALKOT, RAJAHMUNDRY, VIJAYAWADA, TENALI, NELLORE, GUDUR, RENIGUNTA AND TIRUPATI for 12863 and for 12864 at the following stations YESVANTPUR, KRISHANARAJAPURAM, VIJAYAWADA, RAJAHMUNDRY, SAMALKOT, VISHAKAPATNAM, VIZANAGARAM, BRAHMAPUR & KHURDA RD.

Route and halts 

The important halts of the train are:
 
 
 
 
 
 
 
 Eluru

Coach composite

The train has standard ICF rakes with max speed of 110 kmph. The train consists of 24 coaches :
 1 AC II Tier
 4 AC III Tier
 13 Sleeper Coaches
 3 General Unreserved
 2 Seating cum Luggage Rake
 1 Pantry Car

The train has standard LHB rakes with max speed of 110 kmph. The train consists of 22 coaches :
 1 AC II Tier
 4 AC III Tier
 12 Sleeper Coaches
 2 General Unreserved
 2 Seating cum Luggage Rake
 1 Pantry Car

For ICF Rake

 SLR consists of Seating cum Luggage Coach
 GN consists of GENERAL Coach
 B consists of AC 3 Tier Coach
 A consists of AC 2 Tier Coach
 PC consists of Pantry Car Coach
 S consists of SLEEPER Coach

For LHB Rake

 SLR consists of Seating cum Luggage Coach
 GN consists of GENERAL Coach
 B consists of AC 3 Tier Coach
 A consists of AC 2 Tier Coach
 PC consists of Pantry Car Coach
 S consists of SLEEPER Coach

Loco Traction

Train is hauled by WAP-7 loco.
Both trains are hauled by a Santragachi Electric Loco Shed based WAP-4 electric locomotives till  Yeshwanthpur and vice versa.

Direction Reversal

Train Reverses its direction 1 times:

Notes 

Train leaves Yesvantpur at 7:35 PM Daily and reach Howrah on 3 days at 06:25 AM

Train leaves Howrah at 8:35 PM Daily and reach Yesvantpur 3 day at 7:15 AM

See also 
 Yesvantpur Junction railway station
 Howrah Junction railway station
 Howrah - Yesvantpur Humsafar Express
 Howrah Yeshvantapur Duronto Express
 Howrah - Yesvantpur AC Superfast Express

References 

http://www.thehansindia.com/posts/index/Telangana/2018-09-22/Huge-robbery-in-Yeshwantpur-express-victims-complained-to-Kachiguda-railway-police/413542

External links 
 12863/Howrah - Yesvantpur SF Express
 12864/Yesvantpur - Howrah SF Express

Rail transport in Howrah
Transport in Bangalore
Express trains in India
Rail transport in West Bengal
Rail transport in Odisha
Rail transport in Andhra Pradesh
Rail transport in Tamil Nadu
Rail transport in Karnataka
Railway services introduced in 2002